is the debut album by Japanese singer Keiko Masuda. The album was released on February 18, 1982, less than a year after the dissolution of her group Pink Lady. It contains Masuda's first single , which peaked at No. 9 on Oricon's singles charts and sold 267,000 copies.

Track listing

References

External links
 

1982 debut albums
Keiko Masuda albums
Japanese-language albums
Reprise Records albums